Luther Lee Bernard (October 29, 1881 – January 23, 1951) was an American sociologist and psychologist. He was the 22nd President of the American Sociological Association (for the year 1932). He has been described as "among the best known U.S. sociologist in the country... between the 1920 and the 1940,".

Bernard studied at the University of Missouri and at the University of Chicago, where he received his Ph.D. received his doctorate. He then taught sociology and social psychology at various North American universities and was finally a professor of sociology at Pennsylvania State University.

According to Lewis Coser  Bernard's social psychological theory can be described as "modified behaviorism". He adopted basic principles of behaviorism, but emphasized the influence of the environment on character formation. Thanks to him, American social psychology turned away from an exclusively biological orientation.

Works 

 Instincts (1924)
 An Introduction to Social Psychology (1926)
 The Development of Methods in Sociology (1928)
 Sociology and the Study of International Relations (1934)
 Social Control (1939)
 War at its Causes (1944)
 Origins of American Sociology (1943 - with Jessie Bernard).

References

External links 

 Bernard's biography at ASA

1881 births
1951 deaths
American sociologists
Presidents of the American Sociological Association
Pennsylvania State University faculty
University of Chicago alumni
American social psychologists